"While You Loved Me" is a song written by Kim Williams, Danny Wells and Marty Dodson and recorded by American country music group Rascal Flatts. It was released in March 2001 as the third single from the band’s self-titled debut album. The song peaked at number 7 on the U.S. Billboard Hot Country Songs chart.

Background
"We got the song the night before we were going in to track the record.  Mark (Bright) had called us and  said, "You've got to hear this!"  When we heard it, our jaws dropped.  It floored us.  We were looking for a good power ballad.  We had a lot that we had on hold.  Because we all love ballads so much.  It's got to be one that's real special." ~ Gary LeVox

Chart performance
"While You Loved Me" debuted at number 48 on the U.S. Billboard Hot Country Singles & Tracks for the chart week of March 31, 2001.

Year-end charts

References

2001 singles
Rascal Flatts songs
Songs written by Kim Williams (songwriter)
Songs written by Danny Wells (songwriter)
Song recordings produced by Mark Bright (record producer)
Lyric Street Records singles
2000 songs
Songs written by Marty Dodson